KBIE (103.1 FM) is a radio station broadcasting a country music format. Licensed to Auburn, Nebraska, United States, the station serves Nebraska City, southeastern Nebraska and southwestern Iowa, but with fringe coverage in the Omaha and Lincoln areas due to partial interference from KVSS at 102.7 covering Omaha and Lincoln proper. The station is currently owned by Flood Broadcasting, Inc. and features programming from ABC Radio.

References

External links
 Official Website
 

BIE